Carr is an unincorporated community and U.S. Post Office in Weld County, Colorado, United States.  The ZIP Code of the Carr Post Office is 80612. Some consider Carr a ghost town. Today, just a few old houses remain plus the school house and a few old store fronts.  Aside from that there are scattered old foundations throughout the town. There are a few year-round residents but for the most part the town is abandoned.

History
The town of Carr was established by the Union Pacific Railroad in 1872.  Carr was named for Robert E. Carr of the Union Pacific, who managed the construction of the rail line through the town.  The Carr Post Office opened on March 26, 1872. From 1920 until 1939, the town carried Old Colorado State Highway 5, which was meant as an access route. However, during this time, routes numbered 1–19 were major cross state highways, making it a somewhat useless route.

Geography
Carr is located at  (40.896257,-104.875488). Just north of the Carr turnoff on I-25 is the Carr Natural Fort.  It is a natural limestone formation where many noted Indian battles took place between the Crow and Blackfeet tribes.

See also

Outline of Colorado
Index of Colorado-related articles
State of Colorado
Colorado cities and towns
Colorado counties
Weld County, Colorado
Colorado metropolitan areas
Front Range Urban Corridor
North Central Colorado Urban Area
Denver-Aurora-Boulder, CO Combined Statistical Area
Greeley, CO Metropolitan Statistical Area

References

External links

Unincorporated communities in Weld County, Colorado
Unincorporated communities in Colorado
1872 establishments in Colorado Territory